Enriched flour is flour with specific nutrients returned to it that have been lost while being prepared. These restored nutrients include iron and B vitamins (folic acid, riboflavin, niacin, and thiamine). Calcium may also be supplemented. The purpose of enriching flour is to replenish the nutrients in the flour to match the nutritional status of the unrefined product. This differentiates enrichment from fortification, which is the process of introducing new nutrients to a food.

79 countries have fortification or enrichment for wheat or maize flour made "mandatory", according to the Global Fortification Data Exchange.

History 
White flour became adopted in many cultures because it was thought to be healthier than dark flours during the late Middle Ages.  As white flour was more expensive it became a fashionable indicator of perceived social status and tended to be consumed mostly by the richer classes.  Another factor was that mold and fungus in the grains, which led to several diseases, were significantly reduced in the processing that resulted in white flour. 

In the 1920s, Benjamin R. Jacobs began to document the loss of essential nutrients, however, through this processing of cereals and grains and to demonstrate a method by which the end products could be enriched with some of the lost nutrients. These nutrients promote good health and help to prevent some diseases. Enrichment was not possible until 1936, when the synthesis of thiamin was elucidated.

The international effort to start enriching flour was launched during the 1940s as a means to improve the health of the wartime populations of the United Kingdom and United States while food was being rationed and alternative sources of the nutrients were scarce.   The decision to choose flour for enrichment was based on its commonality in the diets of those wartime populations, ranging from the rich to the poor.  These wartime campaigns resulted in 40% of flour being enriched by 1942. In February 1942, the U.S. Army announced that it would purchase only enriched flour. This resulted in a large expansion of enrichment, but smaller local mills were still selling cheap, unenriched flour that could end up consumed by the poor, which needed enrichment the most. In 1943, the War Foods Administration issued a temporary ban on non-enriched bread, finally raising enrichment compliance to 100%.

Flour processing and nutrient loss 
The conversion of grains to flour involves several steps that vary with the type of grain used. The initial stages of processing remove the bran and the germ of the seed. The bran is the outermost layer of grains that contains fiber (primarily insoluble), some protein, and trace minerals. The germ is the embryo of the seed that contains B vitamins and trace minerals. Because the germ has a fat content of 10%, it may reduce shelf-life. Thus, it is separated to ensure longer shelf life of the flour. In contrast to enriched flour, whole wheat flour contains both the bran and the germ. The remaining and largest portion of the seed is the endosperm. It acts as a nutrient reservoir for the developing embryo. The endosperm contains a large amount of carbohydrates, protein, iron, B vitamins (niacin and riboflavin), and soluble fiber. 

Once the endosperm is isolated, it is ground into a fine powder and sifted to remove any remaining fragments of bran or germ. Next, a chemical bleaching process is used to give the flour a whiter color. This bleaching step, usually with chlorine or benzoyl peroxide, destroys many of the original nutrients that were present in the flour. The final flour product contains a smaller portion of the original nutrients that were present in the seed prior to processing. Enrichment ensures that these important nutrients are restored to improve the quality of the flour.

Enrichment requirements 
According to the U.S. FDA, a pound of enriched flour must have the following quantities of nutrients to qualify: 2.9 milligrams of thiamin, 1.8 milligrams of riboflavin, 24 milligrams of niacin, 0.7 milligrams of 
folic acid, and 20 milligrams of iron. The first four nutrients are B vitamins. Calcium also may be added; this must be to a minimum level of 960 milligrams per pound if calcium is mentioned in the labeling. Similar rules are set for grains like rice and maize.

Other countries also have flour enrichment programs.

See also

 Iodised salt – which might be called "Fortified salt".
 Whole-wheat flour

References

 
 
 
 

Flour